Noura Bensaad is a Francophone Tunisian writer who has been called the "Tunisian master of the short story." She was born in Salammbo (a district of Carthage), Tunisia, to a Tunisian father and a French mother. She attended university in Binzerte and graduated with a degree in French literature.

Career 
Bensaad is the author of two novels and two short story collections. Her "exquisite" short stories are known for their Mediterranean settings and "dreamlike" atmospheres, in which she exhibits her characters' hopes and disappointments.

An excerpt of her novel,  (When Birds Dream), was included in the 2010 Banipal issue on Modern Tunisian Literature, translated into English by Lulu Norman. Her short story "L’étranger et la vieille dame," translated into English by Roland Glasser, was included in the Words Without Borders issue on literature by Tunisian women.

Works 

 (2016) 
 (2009) 
 (2004) 
 (2002)

References

21st-century Tunisian women writers
Tunisian writers in French
Living people
21st-century Tunisian writers
Year of birth missing (living people)